Chen Yu (11 November 1901 – 21 March 1974) was a Chinese politician. He served as the Minister of Fuel Industries, and was the Governor of Guangdong province from 1957 to 1967.

References

1901 births
1974 deaths
Governors of Guangdong
People's Republic of China politicians from Guangdong
Chinese Communist Party politicians from Guangdong
Politicians from Shenzhen